Guillermo Yávar Romo (born 26 March 1943) is a Chilean football forward who played for Chile in the 1966 and 1974 FIFA World Cups. He also played for Club Universidad de Chile, where he would lead the club to the semi-finals of the 1970 Copa Libertadores.

References

External links

1943 births
Living people
Chilean footballers
Chile international footballers
Association football forwards
O'Higgins F.C. footballers
Audax Italiano footballers
Cobreloa footballers
Magallanes footballers
Unión Española footballers
Club Deportivo Universidad Católica footballers
Universidad de Chile footballers
Provincial Osorno managers
1966 FIFA World Cup players
1974 FIFA World Cup players
Chilean football managers
Chile national under-20 football team managers
Magallanes managers